Microgramma may refer to:

Microgramma (plant), a genus of ferns in the family Polypodiaceae
Microgramma (typeface)